Die Nacht und der Wein is a German-language studio album by Greek singer Demis Roussos, released in 1976 on Philips Records.

Commercial performance 
The album reached no. 34 in Germany.

Track listing 
All tracks produced by Leo Leandros, except "Perdoname" produced by Demis Roussos.

Charts

References

External links 
 Demis Roussos – Die Nacht und der Wein (vinyl, LP) at Discogs
 Demis Roussos – Die Nacht und der Wein (CD, 2016) at Discogs

1976 albums
Demis Roussos albums
Philips Records albums
Albums produced by Leo Leandros